No. 296 Squadron RAF was an transport squadron of the Royal Air Force during the Second World War. With sister squadrons 295 and 297 it formed 38 Wing, which later expanded to create No. 38 Group RAF.

History

With the Airborne Forces

No. 296 Squadron was formed at Ringway Airport near Manchester on 25 January 1942 from the Glider Exercise Unit as an airborne forces unit, equipped with obsolete Hawker Hectors and Hawker Harts, and moved to RAF Netheravon to concentrate on glider training.
In June 1942 it began to receive the Armstrong Whitworth Whitley and in October 1942 began flying leaflet dropping missions over France. In early 1943 the squadron converted to the Albemarle Mk.I and in Summer 1943 moved 32 aircraft to Froha, Algeria to take part in Operation Husky, the invasion of Sicily, returning later in the year.

The Squadron was involved in the first part of the D-Day landings. On the night of 5/6 June 1944, as part of Operation Tonga, three Albemarles flew Pathfinder parachutists to Normandy followed by eight more loaded with paratroops of 5th Parachute Brigade. During 6 June the squadron returned with a further eight towing Horsa gliders. For Operation Mallard which immediately followed, 296 squadron despatched 19 aircraft towing gliders to Normandy. Other missions involved dropping SAS sabotage teams behind enemy lines. The Albemarle's last major mission came during the battle of Arnhem, where the squadron towed across forty-six gliders in two waves from Manston aerodrome without loss in the first two days of the battle. The Albemarles gave way in September 1944 to the Handley Page Halifax of which 30 were provided for Operation Varsity, the Rhine crossings. At the end of the war the squadron was used to ferry troops to Norway and Denmark to take the German surrender and to bring liberated POWs back to Britain.

With Transport Command
The squadron operated a mail service to India from December 1945 until it disbanded on 23 January 1946 at RAF Earls Colne, Essex.

Aircraft operated

Squadron bases

Commanding officers

See also
 No. 38 Group RAF
 List of Royal Air Force aircraft squadrons

References

Notes

Bibliography

External links

 Site with pages for all squadron of No. 38 Group RAF
 296 Squadron
 Squadron history on MOD site
 squadron histories nos. 296–299 on RAFWeb's Air of Authority – A History of RAF Organisation

296
Aircraft squadrons of the Royal Air Force in World War II
Transport units and formations of the Royal Air Force
Military units and formations established in 1942
Military units and formations disestablished in 1946